Sinan Taymin Albayrak (born 27 February 1973) is a Turkish TV and film actor. He is the brother of journalist and activist Hakan Albayrak.

Early life
Sinan Albayrak was born in Hanau, in the German State of Hesse to Ziya Albayrak, who went to Germany in the early 1960s, seeking work as part of a formal guest worker programme, and his wife Gülbeyaz Albayrak. The Albayraks are of Circassian origin (Hatuqwai and Kabarday). He graduated from Istanbul University State Conservatory, where he took lessons from Yıldız Kenter.

Personal life
He lives in Istanbul with his wife Seda.

Theater
 Dönme Dolap (2019)
 Nerede Kalmıştık - Amphitryon (2003)
 Rumuz Goncagül (2000)
 Ivan Ivanovich Var Mıydı Yok Muydu (1999)
 Bir Cinayetin Söylencesi (1990)

Filmography
Film
 Yunus Emre-Aşkın Sesi (2014)...Sultan Veled
 Sultan'ın Sırrı (2011)
 Esrefpaşalılar (2010)....Imam
 Kiralık Oda (2008)
 Kilit (2008)
 Bayrampaşa: Ben Fazla Kalmayacağım (2007)...Police officer
 Sis ve Gece (2007) .... Mustafa
 Çinliler Geliyor (2006) .... Yupi
 Döngel Kârhanesi (2005) .... Russian gangster
 Herşey Çok Güzel Olacak (1998)...Tolga Baykal

Television
 Kasaba Doktoru (2022-)...Chief physician Yalçın Aygün
 Aşkın Yolculuğu: Hacı Bayram-ı Veli (2022)...Mevlüt Bey
 Kanunsuz Topraklar (2021-2022)...Göksel Yılmaz
 İyi Günde Kötü Günde (2020)...Bülent (TV)
 Kalk Gidelim (2019)...Ali Demir (TV)
 Kurtlar Vadisi Pusu (2015)...Sadık (TV)
 O Hayat Benim (2014)...Mehmet Emir (TV)
 Leyla ile Mecnun (2013)...Tom Waits (guest appearance) (TV)
 Tozlu Yollar (2013)...Tayfun (TV)
 Sen De Gitme (2012)...Mehmet (TV)
 Parmaklıklar Ardında (2007)...Tarık (TV)
 Yersiz Yurtsuz' (2007)...Ishak (TV)
 Beyaz Gelincik (2006)...Melih (TV)
 Kadın Severse (2006) TV
 Sessiz Gece (2005)...Serkan (TV)
 Omuz Omuza (2004)...Cem (TV)
 Kurtlar Vadisi (2005)... Sadık (TV)
 Unutma Beni (2002)...Gökhan (TV)
 Nasıl Evde Kaldım (2001) TV
 Karanlıkta Koşanlar (2001) TV
 Şaşıfelek Çıkmazı (2000)...Rafet (TV)
 Yılan Hikayesi (1999)...David (TV)
 Kara Melek (1996)...Cameraman Mithat (TV)
 Ferhunde Hanımlar (1993) TV
 Geçmişin İzleri'' (1993) TV

References

External links
 

Turkish male film actors
1973 births
Hacettepe University alumni
Living people
German people of Circassian descent
Turkish people of Circassian descent
Turkish male television actors
Turkish male stage actors